Feed the Fish is a 2010 American independent comedy film written and directed by Michael Matzdorff and starring Tony Shalhoub, Ross Partridge and Katie Aselton.  It is Matzdorff's directorial debut.

Plot

The film follows Joe Peterson, a children's book author from California, who travels to Ellison Bay, Wisconsin with his friend J.P. to find inspiration for the belated follow up to his popular book, "Mr. Kitty Feeds the Fish." While there he befriends Axel Anderson and eventually falls for his granddaughter, Sif, much to the dismay of her father, the town's Sheriff.

Cast

Production
The film was shot in Door County, Wisconsin.

Reception
Linda Cook of the Quad-City Times gave a positive review of the film, describing it as "a perfectly warm winter outing."  Chris Foran of the Milwaukee Journal Sentinel awarded the film two stars.

References

External links
 
 

2010 films
American independent films
American comedy films
Films shot in Wisconsin
Films set in Wisconsin
2010 directorial debut films
2010 comedy films
2010s English-language films
2010s American films